The 2020 All-Pro teams were named by the Associated Press (AP), Pro Football Writers of America (PFWA), and Sporting News (SN) for performance in the 2020 NFL season. Any player selected to the first-team of any of the teams can be described as an "All-Pro." The AP team, with first-team and second-team selections, was chosen by a national panel of fifty NFL writers and broadcasters. The Sporting News All-NFL team was voted on by NFL players and executives. The PFWA team is selected by its more than 300 national members who are accredited media members covering the NFL.

For the 2020 vote, the AP removed the offensive "flex" position that had been added to the ballot in 2016, and instead added a third wide receiver to the ballot.

Teams

Key
AP = Associated Press first-team All-Pro
AP-2 = Associated Press second-team All-Pro
AP-t = Tied for first-team All-Pro in the AP vote
AP-2t = Tied for second-team All-Pro in the AP vote
PFWA = Pro Football Writers Association All-NFL
SN = Sporting News All-Pro

References 

All-Pro Teams
Allpro